Alexandra Williams is an American former rugby union player.

Williams helped set up the Women's Premier League. She played for Harvard-Radcliffe RFC, Beantown RFC and for Berkeley All Blues. Williams made her first appearance for the Eagles at the 1993 Canada Cup. She also played at the 1996 and 2000 Canada Cup's.

In 2018 Williams was inducted into the U.S. Rugby Hall of Fame.

References 

Year of birth missing (living people)
Living people
Female rugby union players
American female rugby union players
United States women's international rugby union players
Harvard Crimson rugby players